Foldnutfonna is a glacier in Wedel Jarlsberg Land at Spitsbergen, Svalbard. It has an extension of about three kilometers, is a part of the Recherchebreen complex, and is located between Foldnutane, Haugknatten and Konglomeratfjellet.

References

Glaciers of Spitsbergen